Billecart-Salmon is a medium-sized champagne house in Mareuil-sur-Aÿ, France. Founded in 1818 with the marriage of Nicolas François Billecart and Elisabeth Salmon, it is one of the few to remain family-owned. 

Today, Mathieu Roland-Billecart, the 7th generation of the family, head the House with the support of Antoine, Deputy General Manager in charge of export, Jean and François Roland-Billecart. Mathieu Roland-Billecart is serving as a reminder that the strength of Billecart-Salmon is rooted in the strength of family, affording them ‘‘the luxury of taking their time to make exceptional wine’’. Even if two centuries have passed since the creation of Billecart-Salmon champagnes, its motto remains unchanged: ‘‘Give priority to quality, strive for excellence’’.

Chardonnay, Pinot Noir and Meunier, all carefully cultivated, harvested, worked and blended by the veritable artists of the Billecart-Salmon House, create a range of great champagnes that are renowned amongst connoisseurs from around the world. The flagship of the brand, Champagne Brut Rosé, has been brought up to date by Jean Roland-Billecart in the 1970s, and made the Billecart-Salmon name famous worldwide: its manufacturing secrets and winemaking method perfectly reflect the Billecart-Salmon style.

The Cuvée Nicolas-Francois Billecart 1959 won first place in the Champagne of the Millennium 1999, out of 150 of the finest 20th century Champagnes. A magnum of the winning champagne later sold for £3,300.

Billecart-Salmon was ranked tenth among major Champagne houses by Antoine Gerbelle writing for La Revue du vin de France. La Revue du vin de France's Guide Vert awards Billecart-Salmon two stars out of three. Billecart-Salmon Brut Reserve  are aged in the cellars for 36 months before release.
  
Billecart-Salmon champagnes have been reviewed favourably by wine writer Jancis Robinson.

The Chef de Cave (aka Cellar Master) is, since 2018, Florent Nys. He explains that at Billecart-Salmon they make balanced and fresh wines rather than powerful ones, and that their style is not oxidative, apart from Clos Saint-Hilaire (100% vinified in oak casks).

In its constant quest for excellence, Billecart-Salmon favours cultivation methods that aim to protect the environment and promote biodiversity. Committed to preserving the cycle between winemaker and nature, the House has long been convinced that such a course of action is essential in the pursuit of environmental sustainability. The House’s philosophy is simple: respect the terroir in order to produce great wines. Long before being certified High Environmental Value and Sustainable Viticulture in Champagne in 2017, Maison Billecart-Salmon was already focused on managing its vineyards with the utmost respect for the environment. Beyond a simple approach, it’s a long-term state of mind that calls for constant self-assessment and continuous progress.

See also
 List of Champagne houses

References

External links
 

Champagne producers
French companies established in 1818